Progressive Academy is a private day school in Edmonton, Alberta, Canada. It was founded in 1984. The school teaches students from  pre-school to Grade 12. It is accredited and funded by Alberta Education (Alberta's provincial department of education). 

Progressive Academy is a member of the Association for Independent Schools and Colleges of Alberta (AISCA), which is an advocacy organization for private schools in Alberta.

Progressive Academy's Junior Kindergarten program is licensed by Alberta Child and Family Services to operate a daycare facility and an out-of-school care program. The Junior Kindergarten and out-of-school care programs are also accredited by the Alberta Association for the Accreditation of Early Learning and Care Services (AELCS), on behalf of the Alberta Government.

Russell Weir, Executive Director:

There are so many benefits to sending your child to a school that recognizes the incredible potential of each individual.

Progressive Academy strives to develop well-rounded advanced learners, capable of becoming the entrepreneurs of the future. We develop confidence with intention. Our approaches to education stress understanding through discovery, yet ensure that the necessary base skills are well developed, opening the door for students to pursue subjects as far forward as they are want. 

Students are exposed to many required classes including French and Mandarin as second languages, art history, music (including concert band in Junior High), robotics, as well as many options including public speaking, programming, photography, and sports like fencing and equestrian. Our students perform regularly during the school year to build their confidence and comfort with being in front of crowds.

Our school is best characterized as academic. Students are encouraged to learn beyond their grade or age might dictate. We follow the passion for learning of the student, rather than hold them back based on age. Our highly individualized approach helps students learn at an early age that they are directly responsible for their own development

References

External links
 

Elementary schools in Edmonton
High schools in Edmonton
Private schools in Alberta

Educational institutions established in 1984
1984 establishments in Alberta